Madelyn Deutch (born March 23, 1991) is an American actress, musician and writer. She is known for writing, acting in a lead role, and composing the musical score for the feature film The Year of Spectacular Men.

Early life
Deutch was born in San Fernando Valley, Los Angeles County, California. She is the elder daughter of actress Lea Thompson and director Howard Deutch and sister of actress Zoey Deutch. Her mother, from Minnesota, is of Irish ancestry while her father, from New York, is of Jewish ancestry.

Career
She is known for her recurring role in the television miniseries Texas Rising. She played the role of Dakota in season 1 of Robert Kirkman's Outcast and she will also be seen in season 2. She acted alongside her mother and sister in Mayor Cupcake.

Deutch was seen as Alex in the 2014 American drama film 50 to 1 which is based on the true story of Mine That Bird, an undersized thoroughbred racehorse who won the 2009 Kentucky Derby.  In 2017, she played the lead role alongside her sister Zoey Deutch in her mother's directorial debut The Year of Spectacular Men. She portrays a young woman fresh out of college who kindles and torches relationships with several men, including characters played by Jesse Bradford and Nicholas Braun. She also wrote the script for the film.

Filmography

Television

Film

Video games

Music career

She is a member of the LA-based band BLEITCH with Piers Baron. She has composed and performed songs with Bleitch for her movie The Year of Spectacular Men.

Singles (with BLEITCH)

 2014 - This is Our Youth (part of background soundtrack of Episode 75 "Lost Cause" of True Blood
 2015 - Paint by Numbers
 2015 - Crime
 2015 - Speaking of Moments

References

External links

1991 births
Living people
21st-century American actresses
21st-century American women musicians
Actresses from Los Angeles
American film actresses
American television actresses
American people of Irish descent
Jewish American actresses
21st-century American Jews